Windermere is a community and designated place located south of Invermere on Windermere Lake in the Regional District of East Kootenay.

Demographics
Population (2021): 1,511
Population (2016): 1,092
Population (2011): 1,081
Population (2006): 1,259
Population (2001): 1,060

References

External links
 Windermere on British Columbia website

Populated places in the Regional District of East Kootenay
Designated places in British Columbia